Amy Morrison (born 18 July 1984) is a New Zealand-born film and television actress best known for her role as Zandra in Cloud 9's The Tribe. She also had a brief but memorable role the historical fantasy series Xena: Warrior Princess and Hercules: The Legendary Journeys as the younger version of Hope, the daughter of Gabrielle. Morrison has also played small roles in feature films Jack Be Nimble and Every Woman's Dream as well as appearances on Jack of All Trades, Shortland Street and William Shatner's A Twist in the Tale among other work in television and film.

Biography
Morrison was one of six children born in New Zealand. She began appearing in television commercials at an early age and made her acting debut in the 1993 horror film Jack Be Nimble. The following year, she appeared in the television movies Hercules and the Circle of Fire and Hercules in the Underworld. Partly based on these performances, she eventually had a small role as Gabrielle's daughter Hope on Xena: Warrior Princess and Hercules: The Legendary Journeys.

The character proved to be her breakout role and, in April 1999, she appeared in the starring role in Jessica's Diary, the ninth episode of William Shatner's A Twist in the Tale. Later that year, she was cast in the role of Zandra in another Cloud 9 television project, The Tribe. At age 14, she was introduced as the primary romantic interest of Lex (Caleb Ross). Portrayed as self-absorbed and vain, she served as a "mother figure" to other members of the group (this role would later be taken over by co-star Victoria Spence's character Salene). Her character was involved in an abusive relationship with Lex, however they later married and she became pregnant. She remained on the show for one year before deciding to leave in order to focus on her education. Her departure from the show caused a significant group of fans to start an online petition for her to be brought back on the show, despite her character having been killed off, and is still active as of September 2008.

Her last major role was in a guest appearance on the television series Jack of All Trades in 2000.

After that she has not been in any TV shows and was shown in pictures in The Tribe reunion September 2009 with many of the characters from The Tribe.

Selected filmography

Film

Television

References

External links

1984 births
Living people
New Zealand film actresses
New Zealand television actresses
People from Auckland